Harare International Conference Center (HICC) is an events venue in Zimbabwe, known for hosting major events in the country. The venue is at the Rainbow Towers Hotel administered by Rainbow Towers Group.

The main conferencing auditorium has capacity of 4500 seats and indoor floor space of 5000sqm which can host up to 128 exhibition stands.

Major events 
Joe Thomas Zimbabwe tour in 2008
Mr Vegas show in 2011
Harare International Carnival-2014
Oliver Mtukudzi Greatest Hits Concert in 2014
Fill Up HICC 2017
Sanganai Tourism Expo
Jah Prayzah birthday
Atlas Convention 2020

References 

Convention centers in Zimbabwe
International Conference Center, Harare
Hotels in Zimbabwe
Hotels in Harare